Priscilla Dunn (born October 8, 1943) is an American politician who is currently a Democratic Alabama State Senator. Dunn has served in the Alabama Senate since 2009.

Personal life
Dunn is married to her husband, Grover, and has one daughter, Karen. She received her Bachelor of Science from Alabama State University and her Master of Arts from the University of Montevallo.

Legislative career
From 1998 until 2009 she was a member of the Alabama House of Representatives. Dunn has been a member of the Alabama Senate since a special election was called in 2009. In April 2015 work in the Senate slowed due to a resolution opposing efforts to expand Medicaid. In August 2015 a Senate committee which Dunn was a part of put a ban on selling tissue from aborted fetuses. Dunn cast the sole vote against the ban.

References

Living people
Democratic Party Alabama state senators
African-American women in politics
1943 births
African-American state legislators in Alabama
Alabama State University alumni
University of Montevallo alumni
People from Bessemer, Alabama
Democratic Party members of the Alabama House of Representatives
Women state legislators in Alabama
20th-century American politicians
20th-century American women politicians
21st-century American politicians
21st-century American women politicians
20th-century African-American women
20th-century African-American politicians
21st-century African-American women
21st-century African-American politicians